Kota Samarahan, formerly known as Muara Tuang, is a town and the administrative seat of the Samarahan District in Samarahan Division, Sarawak, Malaysia. It is also a satellite town for Kuching due to its proximity to the city part of Greater Kuching area. Kota Samarahan is gearing towards being the medical and education hub for the State of Sarawak, and is colloquially known as the "Town of Knowledge".

The Kota Samarahan Municipal Council (MPKS) exercises local authority over Samarahan and Asajaya districts, as well as Sadong Jaya subdistrict.

As of 2010, the Kota Samarahan town has a total population of 12,724, and the population of all towns managed by Kota Samarahan Municipal Council is 85,495.

Etymology

Old name "Muara Tuang"
Muara Tuang means "Tuang estuary" in Malay, named as the early settlement was situated at the mouth of Sungai Tuang (Tuang River) leading into Batang Samarahan (Samarahan River; batang is a term referring to the primary downstream or mainstem).

New name "Kota Samarahan"
On 19 August 1983, the Muara Tuang subdistrict was elevated to a full district status, and renamed as Samarahan District. In line with the status elevation, the Muara Tuang bazaar was elevated to a township, and renamed to Kota Samarahan.

Kota Samarahan means "Samarahan city/town" in Malay, named after the district and division, which in turn is named after Batang Samarahan, the main river which is the focal point of the settlement.

History

Geography
Kota Samarahan is a suburb of the greater metropolitan area of Kuching. It is located about 30 km south east of Kuching. The lands in Samarahan District are flat and consists of lowland and peat soil.

Climate
Kota Samarahan has a tropical rainforest climate (Af) with heavy to very heavy rainfall year-round.

Demography

Local government
Kota Samarahan Municipal Council was set up in 1984 to administer Kota Samarahan including its surrounding areas such as Asajaya and Sadong Jaya districts.

Economy
Agriculture is still the main economic activity in Kota Samarahan but light industries were slowly moving in. The service sector, especially in education related-sector, is becoming increasingly significant in Samarahan. Commercial centres were blooming to cater for the increasing population.

Transportation

Local Bus

Prior to 1990, the shortest means of access into Samarahan from Kuching was via a ferry at Sungai Kuap other than direct road access from Jalan Datuk Muhamad Musa which takes longer. The construction of a bridge has further shortened the road distance from between Kuching-Kota Samarahan to 11 kilometers. This new road, officially known as Kuching-Kota Samarahan Expressway, links Kota Samarahan with the major industrial areas of Pending, Demak Laut and Sama Jaya. This new road is currently undergoing some expansion in anticipation of increased traffic between Kuching-Samarahan due to the increasing population in Samarahan.

Other utilities

Education
Kota Samarahan has a concentration of universities and educational facilities, thus forming it into a main educational hub in Sarawak. Institutions of higher learning in the area includes Universiti Malaysia Sarawak, Universiti Teknologi MARA Kota Samarahan Campus (2 campuses), Institute of Teacher Education (Tun Abdul Razak Campus, Kota Samarahan Industrial Training Institute (ILPKS) and AAA Zenith Services (English language service provider).

Medical Facilities

The Sarawak Heart Centre is located in Kota Samarahan. The RM400 million centre, formerly known as Sarawak International Medical Centre (SIMC), was assigned professional cardiac specialists, along with the latest modern technology. In addition, Universiti Malaysia Sarawak (UNIMAS) has proposed to build a training hospital for its Medicine and Health Sciences Faculty under the 10th Malaysia Plan.

Leisure and conservation areas

Retail
As numerous housing and commercial areas are being developed since Kota Samarahan became a township in 1986, Kota Samarahan never really had a shopping mall until 2013. Food, clothing, household and lifestyle needs were served by eateries, markets and retailers located in commercial shoplots near housing developments.

On 29 June 2013, The Summer Shopping Mall opened its doors to the public. Covering 900,000 square feet of commercial area consisting of approximately 200 retail stores, 1500 parking spaces, and a multiplex, it became the first shopping mall and latest landmark of Kota Samarahan. The Summer integrated resort masterplan included a hotel and a water theme park built adjacent to the mall. As of date, the Summer Serviced Suites has yet to be operational, and the construction of Summer Lagoon Water Theme Park is incomplete and abandoned.

Aiman Mall was officially opened on 22 April 2017, being the first Halal mall and the first suburban mall in terms of retail space (over 140,000 square  feet).  Boasting a 100 percent tenancy on its grand opening day, this suburban mall is mainly targeted for the low income group.

The latest addition to the Kota Samarahan retail arena is the La Promenade Mall, a four-storey commercial development, which is also part of the 10-storey HSL Tower Complex. Officially opened on 25 January 2021, both the 10-storey office block and four-storey mall are built to the latest Green Building Index standards and are 25% more energy efficient. Mainly catering to the La Promenade's luxury gated community, the mall exercises a 'support local' tenancy policy, and also has dedicated a portion of retail area on Level 4 to charity.

External links
 Kota Samarahan Municipal Council

References

Samarahan District
Towns in Sarawak